August Gottfried Knoche (17 March 1813, Halberstadt – 2 January 1901, near La Guaira) was a German doctor and surgeon. He is best known for inventing an embalming fluid that was used to mummify dozens of corpses (including his own) at his laboratory in Venezuela.

Biography 
In 1837, he studied at the University of Freiburg and worked in the University's hospital. Three years later, he went to Venezuela and settled in La Guaira, where he tended to the large number of German emigrants who were farming nearby along the litoral. Once he was fully established there, he brought his wife and daughter from Germany, putting them to work as his nurse and assistant.

He was known as a charitable man, who treated poor patients without charge, and was considered fearless in his fight against a cholera epidemic that was ravaging the area. In 1845, his doctor's credentials were certified locally, by the Universidad Central de Venezuela. He was also a nature lover, and went on many horseback excursions into the neighboring mountains. It was then that he decided to become a land owner, perhaps inspired by the small fincas from colonial days that dotted the area. The "Hacienda Buena Vista" would later become the site of his laboratory and family mausoleum.

From 1854 to 1856, he helped reestablish the old "Hospital San Juan de Dios". Later, during the Federal War, when many bodies were brought from the battlefields, he became fascinated with the process of decomposition and began experimenting on unclaimed corpses, which he took on muleback to his laboratory at Buena Vista. Soon, he devised a fluid that could be injected into the veins and preserve the cadaver without having to remove the organs.

After finishing the process, with the corpse elegantly dressed and groomed, he placed it at a desk in the entryway of his (Lander's) house, where it remained for forty years, until President Antonio Guzmán Blanco had it interred on behalf of Lander's descendants. In fact, Lander died in 1845, long before Knoche is believed to have developed his formula. It may be a humorous way of explaining why Lander's body was not placed in the National Pantheon until 1884, or a sly commentary on his character by people who believed that he was nothing more than an "armchair revolutionary". The story could have been inspired by the well-known fate of Jeremy Bentham's corpse.

In preparation for Knoche's own death, he concocted the proper dosage and entrusted it to his nurse (and possibly cousin) Amalie Weismann. She carried out this commission faithfully, and remained at Buena Vista until her death in 1926 at the age of eighty-eight when, in accordance with her wishes, she was also placed in the mausoleum. As she became more reclusive, locals began to refer to her as the "Witch of Ávila" and she was said to have the power to talk to birds.

Legacy

His fluid is believed to have been based on an aluminum chloride compound, but the complete formula has never been discovered, if in fact it was ever written down. The "Hacienda Buena Vista" is in ruins. The mausoleum was heavily vandalized and has been reconstructed. In addition to Knoche, it held the remains of his daughter Anna (1840–1879), her husband Heinrich Müller (1822–1881) and Knoche's brother Wilhelm (1817–1874). His wife returned to Germany because she didn't like the isolation or the weather at the hacienda, and the fate of Anna's son, Oswald, is unknown. When the mausoleum was first visited by an exploratory team in 1929, the bodies had been removed from their containers and strewn about. Originally, it is said, mummified dogs served as the mausoleum's "guardians". Over the years, many medical students have visited there, attempting to discover the fluid's formula. The hacienda and mausoleum are located in what is now El Ávila National Park.

Further reading
Guillermo José Schael: "Brújula”: Desde los Welser al Doctor Knoche", in El Universal, March 1971.
Gabriela Moreno: "Las momias criollas del doctor Knoche", in Todo en Domingo, (a magazine insert from El Nacional''), 2 (60), pp. 46–48. November 2000.

References

External links

"Dr.Knoche y sus Mumías", a website created by Miguel Jaramillo.
"Doctor Knoche, el Vampiro de Galipan" by Ramón Urdaneta @ Venezuela y el Mundo (blog).
"Tras la leyenda del Doctor Knoche: El Frankenstein del Caribe" @ TuZona (with a short video)
Brief biography of Knoche in English @ Historic Tourism
"De Lacte Mulierum" (On Women's Milk): Knoche's doctoral dissertation @ Google Books
Official Belarus Venezuela Movie http://www.doctorknoche.com/

1813 births
1901 deaths
19th-century German physicians
People from Halberstadt
University of Freiburg alumni
German emigrants to Venezuela
Mummies
Venezuelan surgeons